Kanha (Marathi: "कान्हा") is a 2016 Marathi language action drama film. film is directed by Avdhoot Gupte. It stars Gashmeer Mahajani and Vaibbhav Tatwawdi in lead roles. Movie had its theatrical release in India on 26 August 2016.

Synopsis
Kanha is based on the festival of Dahi Handi, which is very popular in Maharashtra. The film is about this festival, the politics involved in it and the way it has become an integral part in the life of the Marathi Manoos.

Cast 
 Gashmeer Mahajani as Raghu
 Vaibbhav Tatwawdi as Malhar 
 Gauri Nalawade
 Prasad Oak
 Akshay Kelkar
 Sumedh Wani
 Kiran Karmarkar
 Omprakash Shinde
 Shreevallabh Bhatt

Release
Kanha was released on 26 August 2016 with English subtitles in Maharashtra, Gujarat, Goa, Madhya Pradesh, Delhi, Karnataka, Andhra Pradesh and Telangana.

Box office

References

External links 
 

2016 films
Indian action drama films
2010s Marathi-language films
2016 action drama films